Bill Schaefer or Schaeffer may refer to:

Bill Schaefer (field hockey) (1925–2003), New Zealand field hockey player
William Donald Schaefer (1921–2011), American politician
Charles William Schaeffer (1813–1896), American politician
Billy Schaeffer (born 1951), American basketball player